Clayton High School may refer to:

Clayton High School (Missouri) — Clayton, Missouri
Clayton High School (North Carolina) — Clayton, North Carolina
Clayton Middle/High School — Clayton, New Jersey
Clayton High School (New Mexico) — Clayton, New Mexico
Clayton High School (Oklahoma) — Clayton, Oklahoma
Clayton Valley High School — Concord, California
North Clayton High School — College Park, Georgia